Club de l'hôtel de Massiac or the Massiac Club was a political club in Paris in France during the French Revolution.  The club was formed in 20 August 1789 and dissolved after the Haitian Revolution in August 1791.  

It was situated in the Hotel Massiac in Paris, hence its name. It was a counter-revolutionary club composed of slave owning planters from the French Antilles with the purpose of influencing their interests on the French parliament, particularly in regards to issue of slavery, and lobby against the implementation of the Declaration of the Rights of Man and of the Citizen and the abolition of slavery in the colonies, working against the Society of the Friends of the Blacks. The club was successful in their task and managed to delay the implementation of the rights introduced in Paris for a long time.

References

Groups of the French Revolution
1789 in France
1789 events of the French Revolution
1790 events of the French Revolution
1791 events of the French Revolution
Political organizations based in France
Political parties established in 1789
1791 disestablishments
Slavery in France
1789 establishments in France
Haitian Revolution
Saint-Domingue
Proslavery activists